John Herbert Quick (October 23, 1861 – May 10, 1925) was an American writer and politician.

Biography
Born October 23, 1861, near Steamboat Rock, Grundy County, Iowa, to Martin and Margaret Coleman Quick, he was afflicted with polio as a child. He married Ella Corey in 1890.

Quick established a law firm in Sioux City, where he practiced for 19 years. He also became a businessman and later served as one of the 27th Mayor of Sioux City, Iowa from 1898 to 1900. An historical marker, Herbert Quick Ravine, can be found in Sioux City. The plaque reads "Named in Memory of Herbert Quick.Statesman-Writer--Mayor of Sioux City-He Knew and Loved the Prairie'sof Iowa-1861-1925. (Historical Marker Database HMdb.org)

Among his 18 books are the historical romances Vandemark's Folly (1922), The Hawkeye (1923), and The Invisible Woman (1924). An early environmentalist, his best known non-fiction work was On Board the Good Ship Earth (1913). He also wrote an autobiography, One Man's Life (1925).

Quick's 1906 comic novel, Double Trouble, or, Every Hero His Own Villain was the basis for a 1915 silent film produced by D.W. Griffith, directed by Christy Cabanne, and starring Douglas Fairbanks in one of his earliest film roles.

Quick died on May 10, 1925, in Columbia, Missouri.

Legacy
The John Herbert Quick House was listed on the National Register of Historic Places in 1984. A statue of Quick was erected in Grundy Center, Iowa.

References

External links

 
 
 
 
 

1861 births
1925 deaths
20th-century American novelists
American male novelists
20th-century American memoirists
Novelists from Iowa
People from Bath (Berkeley Springs), West Virginia
20th-century American male writers
American male non-fiction writers